This is a list of music subgenres of country music.

Alternative country
Americana
Cowpunk/Country-punk
Gothic country
Roots rock
Australian country music
Bush band
Bakersfield sound
Bluegrass
Old-time bluegrass/Appalachian bluegrass
Traditional bluegrass/Neo-Traditional bluegrass
Progressive bluegrass/Nu-grass
Bluegrass gospel
Bro-country
Canadian country music
Christian country music
Classic country
Coastal Country
Country and Irish
Country blues
Countrycore
Country en Español
Country folk
Country pop/Cosmopolitan country
Country rap/Hick-hop
Country EDM
Country rock
Cowboy pop
Cowboy/Western music
Dansband music
Franco-country
Gulf and western
Hokum
Honky tonk music
Instrumental country
Lubbock sound
Nashville sound 
Countrypolitan
Neotraditional country
New country
Old-time music
Outlaw country
Progressive country
Rockabilly/Neo-Rockabilly
Psychobilly/Punkabilly
Gothabilly/Hellbilly
Southern rock
Southern soul 
Sertanejo music 
Talking blues
Traditional Country music
Truck-driving country
Cowboy/Western music
New Mexico music
Red dirt
Tex-Mex/Tejano
Texas country
Progressive country
Western swing

 
Country